Lingqijing (or Ling Ch'i Ching; 靈棋經 lit. "Classic of the Divine Chess") is a Chinese book of divination. It is not known when, nor by whom, it was written, though legend has it that the strategist Zhang Liang got it from Huang Shigong (黃石公), a semi-mythological figure in Chinese history. The first commented edition of the work appeared in the Jin Dynasty.

As its name suggests, the work concerns "divining" with tokens, such as Chinese chess (xiangqi i.e.象棋) pieces (instead of with the more traditional turtle shells or yarrow stalks used in I Ching divination).

Twelve Xiangqi pieces  are used; each piece is a disc with a character on one side, and the other side unmarked.  Four have the character for "up" (pronounced shang), four have the character for "middle" (zhong), and four have the character for "down" (xia), representing respectively the Three Realms: Heaven (tian), Humanity (ren), and Earth (di).  

The text of the Lingqijing has an entry for all 125 combinations (i.e., three kinds of pieces, times the five possibilities for each kind: one through four pieces landing face up, or none).

Notes

See also
 I Ching - the most famous Chinese oracle, much more complex than the Lingqijing
 Taixuanjing - similar to the I Ching
 Xiangqi - the board game that is commonly called Chinese chess
 Qi Men Dun Jia - a divination/astrology 
 Zhang Liang - a purported author of the Lingqijing
 Three Strategies of Huang Shigong - another work by another purported author/editor of the Lingqijing.

References

Divination
Chinese books of divination